Climate change conspiracy theories assert that the scientific consensus on global warming is based on conspiracies to produce manipulated data or suppress dissent. It is one of a number of tactics used in climate change denial to attempt to manufacture political and public controversy disputing this consensus. Conspiracy theorists typically allege that, through worldwide acts of professional and criminal misconduct, the science behind global warming and climate change has been invented or distorted for ideological or financial reasons.

Background 

As stated by the Intergovernmental Panel on Climate Change (IPCC), the largest contributor to global warming is the increase in atmospheric carbon dioxide (CO2) since 1750, particularly from fossil fuel combustion, cement production, and land use changes such as deforestation.  The IPCC's Fifth Assessment Report (AR5) states:

The evidence for global warming due to human influence has been recognized by the national science academies of all the major industrialized countries. No scientific body of national or international standing maintains a formal opinion dissenting from the summary conclusions of the IPCC.

Despite this scientific consensus on climate change, allegations have been made that scientists and institutions involved in global warming research are part of a global scientific conspiracy or engaged in a manipulative hoax. There have been allegations of malpractice, most notably in the Climatic Research Unit email controversy ("ClimateGate"). Eight committees investigated these allegations and published reports, each finding no evidence of fraud or scientific misconduct. The Muir Russell report stated that the scientists' "rigor and honesty as scientists are not in doubt," that the investigators "did not find any evidence of behavior that might undermine the conclusions of the IPCC assessments," but that there had been "a consistent pattern of failing to display the proper degree of openness." The scientific consensus that global warming is occurring as a result of human activity remained unchanged at the end of the investigations.

Claims

Key claims

Alleged conspiracies by scientists who accept the reality of global warming 

 Faked scientific data: In 2002, after Clive Hamilton criticized Lavoisier Group, the Cooler Heads Coalition published an article supporting the Lavoisier Group's conspiracy theory that hundreds of climate scientists have twisted their results to support the climate change theory in order to protect their research funding. In 2007, John Coleman wrote a blog post claiming that global warming is the greatest scam in history. He wrote "Our universities have become somewhat isolated from the rest of us. There is a culture and attitudes and values and pressures on campus that are very different.... They all look askance at the rest of us, certain of their superiority.... These scientists know that if they do research and results are in no way alarming, their research will gather dust on the shelf and their research careers will languish. But if they do research that sounds alarms, they will become well known and respected and receive scholarly awards and, very importantly, more research dollars will come flooding their way. So when these researchers did climate change studies in the late 90's they were eager to produce findings that would be important and be widely noticed and trigger more research funding. It was easy for them to manipulate the data to come up with the results they wanted to make headlines and at the same time drive their environmental agendas. Then their like minded PHD colleagues reviewed their work and hastened to endorse it without question.". The climate deniers involved in Climategate in 2009 claimed that researchers faked the data in their research publications and suppressed their critics in order to receive more funding (i.e. taxpayer money). Some climate change deniers claim that there is no scientific consensus on climate change, and they sometimes claim that any evidence that shows there is scientific consensus is faked. Some of them even claim that governments have used the research grant money to pervert the science.
 Corrupted peer-review process: It is claimed that the peer-review process for papers in climate science has become corrupted by scientists seeking to suppress dissent. Frederick Seitz wrote an article in Wall Street Journal in 1996 criticizing IPCC Second Assessment Report. He suspected corruption in the peer-review process, writing that "A comparison between the report approved by the contributing scientists and the published version reveals that key changes were made after the scientists had met and accepted what they thought was the final peer-reviewed version. The scientists were assuming that the IPCC would obey the IPCC Rules--a body of regulations that is supposed to govern the panel's actions. Nothing in the IPCC Rules permits anyone to change a scientific report after it has been accepted by the panel of scientific contributors and the full IPCC.".

Alleged political conspiracies 

 Aiming at global governance: In a speech given to the US Senate Committee on the Environment and Public Works on July 28, 2003, entitled "The Science of Climate Change", Senator James Inhofe (Republican, for Oklahoma) concluded by asking the following question: "With all of the hysteria, all of the fear, all of the phony science, could it be that man-made global warming is the greatest hoax ever perpetrated on the American people?" He further stated, "some parts of the IPCC process resembled a Soviet-style trial, in which the facts are predetermined, and ideological purity trumps technical and scientific rigor." Inhofe has suggested that supporters of the Kyoto Protocol such as Jacques Chirac are aiming at global governance. William M. Gray said in 2006 that global warming became a political cause because of the lack of any other enemy following the end of the Cold War. He went on to say that its purpose was to exercise political influence, to try to introduce world government, and to control people, adding, "I have a demonic view on this." The TV documentary The Great Global Warming Swindle was made by Martin Durkin, who called global warming "a multi-billion-dollar worldwide industry, created by fanatically anti-industrial environmentalists." In the Washington Times in 2007 he said that his film would change history, and predicted that "in five years the idea that the greenhouse effect is the main reason behind global warming will be seen as total bunk."
 Liberal extremists: There are theories claiming that "climate change is a hoax perpetrated by leftist radicals to undermine local sovereignty", or "climate science is less about science and more about socialist ideology". In 2017, James Inhofe told the 12th International Conference on Climate Change "The liberal extremists are not going to give up. Obama has built a culture of radical alarmists, and they’ll be back. You and I and the American people have won a great victory, but the war goes on. Stay vigilant."
 Green scam: "Another conspiracy theory argues that because many people have invested in renewable-energy companies, they stand to lose a lot of money if global warming is shown to be a myth. According to this theory, environmental groups therefore bribe climate scientists to doctor their data so that they are able to secure their financial investment in green energy."
 China is behind it: In 2010, Donald Trump claimed that "With the coldest winter ever recorded, with snow setting record levels up and down the coast, the Nobel committee should take the Nobel Prize back from Al Gore....Gore wants us to clean up our factories and plants in order to protect us from global warming, when China and other countries couldn’t care less. It would make us totally noncompetitive in the manufacturing world, and China, Japan and India are laughing at America’s stupidity." Then in 2012, he tweeted that "The concept of global warming was created by and for the Chinese in order to make U.S. manufacturing non-competitive." Later in 2016 during his presidential campaign he suggested that his 2012 tweet was a joke saying that "Obviously, I joke. But this is done for the benefit of China, because China does not do anything to help climate change. They burn everything you could burn; they couldn’t care less. They have very—you know, their standards are nothing. But they—in the meantime, they can undercut us on price. So it’s very hard on our business."
 To promote nuclear power: One of the claims made in The Great Global Warming Swindle is that the "threat of global warming is an attempt to promote nuclear power".

Negative effects 
Climate change conspiracy theories have resulted in poor action or no action at all to effectively mitigate the damage done by global warming. In some countries like the United States of America, 40% of Americans believe that climate change is a hoax  in spite of the fact that there is a 100% consensus among climate scientists that it is not according to a report in 2019.

“Exposure to conspiracy theories reduced people’s intentions to reduce their carbon footprint, relative to people who were given refuting information."

In 2019, as the U.S. president, Donald Trump even pulled the United States out of the Paris Agreement, which was set up in the hopes of reducing global warming. There may be an ideology of climate change denial in some regions of the world, which would lead to disagreements over how to handle climate change and what should be done in the face of it.

Criticism
Steve Connor links the terms "hoax" and "conspiracy," saying, "Reading through the technical summary of this draft (IPCC) report, it is clear that no one could go away with the impression that climate change is some conspiratorial hoax by the science establishment, as some would have us believe."

The documentary The Great Global Warming Swindle received criticism from several experts. George Monbiot described it as  "the same old conspiracy theory that we’ve been hearing from the denial industry for the past ten years". Similarly, in response to James Delingpole, Monbiot stated that his Spectator article was "the usual conspiracy theories [...]  working to suppress the truth, which presumably now includes virtually the entire scientific community and everyone from Shell to Greenpeace  and The Sun to Science."  Some Australian meteorologists also weighed in, saying that the film made no attempt to offer a "critical deconstruction of climate science orthodoxies", but instead used various other means to suggest that climate scientists are guilty of lying or are seriously misguided.  Although the film's publicist's asserted that "global warming is 'the biggest scam of modern times'", these meteorologists concluded that the film was "not scientifically sound and presents a flawed and very misleading interpretation of the science".

Former UK Secretary of State for Environment, Food and Rural Affairs David Miliband presented a rebuttal of the main points of the film and stated "There will always be people with conspiracy theories trying to do down the scientific consensus, and that is part of scientific and democratic debate, but the science of climate change looks like fact to me."

National Geographic fact-checked 6 persistent scientific conspiracy theories. Regarding the persistent belief in a global warming hoax they note that the Earth is continuing to warm and the rate of warming is increasing as documented in numerous scientific studies. The rise in global temperature and its rate of increase coincides with the rise of greenhouse gases in the atmosphere due to human activity. Moreover, global warming is causing Arctic sea ice to thaw at historic rates, many species of plants are blooming earlier than expected, and the migration routes of many birds, fish, mammals, and insects are changing.

Funding

There is evidence that some of those alleging such conspiracies are part of well-funded misinformation campaigns designed to manufacture controversy, undermine the scientific consensus on climate change and downplay the projected effects of global warming. Individuals and organisations kept the global warming debate alive long after most scientists had reached their conclusions. These doubts have influenced policymakers in both Canada and the US, and have helped to form government policies.

Greenpeace presented evidence of the energy industry funding climate change denial in their 'Exxon Secrets' project.  An analysis conducted by The Carbon Brief in 2011 found that 9 out of 10 of the most prolific authors who cast doubt on climate change or speak against it had ties to ExxonMobil. Greenpeace have said that Koch industries invested more than US$50 million in the past 50 years on spreading doubts about climate change. ExxonMobil announced in 2008 that it would cut its funding to many of the groups that "divert attention" from the need to find new sources of clean energy, although in 2008 still funded over "two dozen other organisations who question the science of global warming or attack policies to solve the crisis." A survey carried out by the UK Royal Society found that in 2005 ExxonMobil distributed US$2.9 million to 39 groups that "misrepresented the science of climate change by outright denial of the evidence".

Books written by conspiracy theorists 

 Inhofe, James. The Greatest Hoax—How the global warming conspiracy threatens your future (2012).
 Bell, Larry. Climate of Corruption—Politics and power behind the global warming hoax (2011).
 Andrew Montford. The Hockey Stick Illusion—Climate and the corruption of science (2015).
 Solomon, Lawrence. The Deniers—The world-renowned scientists who stood up against global warming, political persecution and fraud (2010).
 Michaels, Pat and Balling, Robert. Climate of Extremes—Global warming science they don’t want you to know (2009).
 Sussman, Brian. Climategate—A veteran meteorologist exposes the global warming scam (2010).
 Isaac, Rael Jean. Roosters of the Apocalypse—How the junk science of global warming nearly bankrupted the Western world (2013).

Fictional representations

The novel State of Fear by Michael Crichton, published in December 2004, describes a conspiracy by scientists and others to create public panic about global warming. The novel includes 20 pages of footnotes, described by Crichton as providing a factual basis for the non-plotline elements of the story. In a Senate speech on 4 January 2005, Inhofe  mistakenly described Crichton as a "scientist", and said the book's fictional depiction of environmental organizations primarily "focused on raising money, principally by scaring potential contributors with bogus scientific claims and predictions of a global apocalypse" was an example of "art imitating life."

In a piece headed Crichton's conspiracy theory, Harold Evans described Crichton's theory as being "in the paranoid political style identified by the renowned historian Richard Hofstadter," and went on to suggest that "if you happen to be in the market for a conspiracy theory today, there's a rather more credible one documented by the pressure group Greenpeace," namely the funding by ExxonMobil of groups opposed to the theory of global warming.

See also

 Global warming controversy
 Political activities of the Koch family
 Right-wing antiscience
 Merchants of Doubt – Analysis of climate change denial in the United States by Erik M. Conway and Naomi Oreskes

Notes

Works cited
 . Climate Change 2013 Working Group 1 website.

Further reading 
 Lahsen, M. (1999). The Detection and Attribution of Conspiracies: The Controversy Over Chapter 8. In G. E. Marcus (Ed.), Paranoia Within Reason: A Casebook on Conspiracy as Explanation (pp. 111–36). Chicago, IL: University of Chicago Press. .

Science and technology-related conspiracy theories
Climate change and society
.
Conspiracy theories promoted by Donald Trump